Cynthia Michele Watros (born September 2, 1968) is an American actress recognized for her roles in both daytime and primetime television. In 1994, she was cast in the regular role of Annie Dutton on Guiding Light, which earned her the Daytime Emmy Award for Outstanding Lead Actress in a Drama Series in 1998. In 2002, she was cast as Kellie on The Drew Carey Show and in 2005 joined the cast of Lost as Libby Smith. Since 2019, Watros has portrayed the role of Nina Reeves on ABC's General Hospital.

Early life
Watros was born in Lake Orion, Michigan. She attended Macomb Community College in Clinton Township, Michigan, and received a Bachelor of Fine Arts degree in theatre from Boston University, where she was part of the Professional Actors Training Program.

Career
Watros initially became known for her role as Annie Dutton on the CBS soap opera Guiding Light from 1994 to 1998. Her character, a nurse, began as a heroine, but she gained notice and critical acclaim as her character gradually descended into madness. In 1998, Watros won the Daytime Emmy Award for Outstanding Lead Actress in a Drama Series for her role on Guiding Light. In 1998, she briefly filled in for Jensen Buchanan as Victoria Hudson McKinnon on Another World while Buchanan was on maternity leave.

Watros appeared as Erin Fitzpatrick on Titus from 2000 to 2002 and gained recognition as a comedic actress, playing the fiancée of the title character. According to the DVD commentary, Erin was intended to be neurotic and socially awkward, but the character was revised a week before the pilot was shot. After Titus was canceled, she took on the role of Kellie Newmark on The Drew Carey Show, as a replacement for Christa Miller. Watros played the role from 2002–04.

From 2005 to 2006, Watros was a cast member on the ABC series Lost, playing psychologist Libby, a member of the "Tailies", a group of survivors of the plane crash who were in the tail section of the plane (and not seen during Season One). She was a romantic interest to Hurley and was very mysterious showing up in flashbacks.

After her departure from Lost in 2006, Watros filmed a pilot for a show titled My Ex-Life for CBS. She was slated to play the ex-wife of a character played by Tom Cavanagh. However, the pilot was not chosen by CBS. Watros was also the lead in the 2007 CBS television pilot for The Rich Inner Life of Penelope Cloud, a comedy about a former literary genius who, after an awakening, decides to pursue optimism instead of cynicism.

In 2009, Watros filmed a pilot for Valley Girls, a spin-off of the CW series Gossip Girl set in the 1980s, in which she played CeCe Rhodes, the socialite ex-wife of Rick Rhodes, and mother of the series' protagonists. In a May 2009 episode of the USA series In Plain Sight, "A Stand-Up Triple", she guest starred as a mother of three children in the witness protection program. Beginning in April 2010, Watros joined the cast of the TV medical drama House for seven episodes as Samantha Carr, one of Dr. James Wilson's ex-wives.

Watros appeared in the 2012 indie film, Electrick Children. In May 2012, she guest-starred in episode 8.22 of Grey's Anatomy. In June 2013, she guest-starred in episode 4.17 of Warehouse 13. She played Mary Matrix, coach of the FPS Varsity team in the online series Video Game High School. Her character first appears in season two of the series, which started July 2013. Watros starred as Avery Jenning's self-obsessed aunt in Dog with a Blog on December 6, 2013.

In 2013, Watros joined the cast of the CBS soap opera The Young and the Restless, but left the show in early 2014 with her character being recast. In July 2014, she joined the cast of the MTV series Finding Carter.

In 2019, Watros joined the cast of General Hospital as Nina Reeves, taking over the role from actress Michelle Stafford who's returning to the CBS soap opera The Young and the Restless. Watros also makes a guest appearance in the digital drama series Misguided, playing a waitress named Anne, and is a throw back to her role as Annie Dutton on Guiding Light.

Personal life
 Watros was married to Curtis Gilliland from 1996 to 2020. They have twin daughters, born in 2001.

In 2006, Watros pleaded guilty to a DUI charge.  She was fined, ordered to undergo counseling, and had her driver's license suspended for 90 days.

In 2008, Watros participated in a USO tour to Iraq, visiting several bases, including COP Callahan in Baghdad's East Adamiyah area.

Filmography

Film

Television

Awards and nominations

References

External links

1968 births
Living people
20th-century American actresses
21st-century American actresses
Actresses from Michigan
American musical theatre actresses
American film actresses
American television actresses
American soap opera actresses
Daytime Emmy Award winners
Daytime Emmy Award for Outstanding Lead Actress in a Drama Series winners
People from Lake Orion, Michigan
Boston University College of Fine Arts alumni